Money Talks News is a nationally syndicated consumer/personal finance news series and website offering tips and advice on investing, saving money and avoiding rip offs in the United States market.  It is hosted by Stacy Johnson. The program's news segments are approximately  minutes in length and air as part of local news programs nationwide. The show is more commonly referred to as Money Talks with Stacy Johnson.

Distribution
Money Talks is distributed nationally as a news segment on NBC, CBS, FOX, and ABC networks.  Additionally, editorial pieces are distributed using various websites and web-media outlets under the Money Talks brand.

Publishers
J&G Productions, Inc. publishes the Money Talks with Stacy Johnson television news series and website along with the Life or Debt: Online financial education program, an online financial literacy course used primarily in pre-discharge bankruptcy education by non-profit credit counseling agencies. The course has been approved by the United States Trustee Program.

References

External links
Money Talks with Stacy Johnson
Life or Debt: Online

American television news shows
1992 American television series debuts
1990s American television series
2000s American television series
2010s American television series